Dynge Castle, also formerly known as Dyngehus, is a  castle ruin in central Bohuslän, Sweden. It was built around 1250 when the area was under Norwegian rule and was in use until the beginning of the 16th century, when it burned down. It is one of few remaining medieval structures in Uddevalla Municipality, alongside Dragsmark Abbey and Bokenäs Old Church.

History
The castle was in shape similar to a motte-and-bailey, with a stone keep surrounded by a small moat, standing on top of a cliff overlooking Gullmarsfjorden. The foundations of the central keep's walls remain clearly visible, as does the moat. 
The site was excavated between 1912–13 by Swedish archaeologist Wilhelm Berg (1839-1915). 
Berg was the secretary of the Gothenburg and Bohuslän Antiquities Association and had also excavated the contemporary and similar Ragnhildsholmen fortification at  Kungahälla during the 1880s  and Olsborg  at Tanum.

References

Related reading
Arne Gunnarsjaa (2006)  Norges arkitekturhistorie (Abstrakt forlag)

Other sources
 

 

History of Bohuslän
Archaeological sites in Sweden
Castles in Bohuslän